The Cathedral of Panagia Portaitissa of Iberia is a cathedral of the Georgian Orthodox Church in Tbilisi, Georgia. Construction was inaugurated in 2012 by the initiative of the Catholicos Patriarch of All Georgia, Ilia II. The cathedral is dedicated after the original Panagia Portaitissa icon held at the Monastery of the Iberians on Mount Athos.

References

Churches in Tbilisi
Georgian Orthodox cathedrals in Georgia (country)
Eastern Orthodox icons of the Virgin Mary
21st-century Eastern Orthodox church buildings